The WWA Middleweight Championship (Campeonato de peso Medio WWA in Spanish) is a secondary professional wrestling championship promoted by the Mexican Lucha Libre wrestling-based promotion World Wrestling Association (WWA) since 1987.

As it was a professional wrestling championship, the championship was not won not by actual competition, but by a scripted ending to a match determined by the bookers and match makers. On occasion the promotion declares a championship vacant, which means there is no champion at that point in time. This can either be due to a storyline, or real life issues such as a champion suffering an injury being unable to defend the championship, or leaving the company.

Super Muñeco was the first Middleweight champion, winning it in 1987. It was defended throughout Mexico and Japan during the 1980s and 90s, but had been defended almost exclusively in Tijuana, Mexico since 2001. A separate version has been defended in the Mexico City-Monterrey area since 2002 when Blue Panther began defending a title labelled the WWA Middleweight Championship. Since the WWA titles have been largely unsanctioned since the late 1990s it means that they can be defended on any wrestling show, not just limited to WWA promoted shows.

Title history

Mexico City/Monterrey version

Footnotes

References

External links
W.W.A. World Middleweight Title (Mexico)
WWA World Middleweight Title

Middleweight wrestling championships
World Wrestling Association (Mexico) Championships